Elwira Żmudzka is a Polish climatologist. She is president of the Association of Polish Climatologists.

She is a research and teaching fellow at the University of Warsaw.

Works

References 

Living people
Academic staff of the University of Warsaw
Polish climatologists
Women climatologists
Place of birth missing (living people)
Year of birth missing (living people)